Sprigg is an unincorporated community in Mingo County, West Virginia, United States. Sprigg had a post office, which opened on May 5, 1896, and closed on April 19, 1997.

References

Unincorporated communities in Mingo County, West Virginia
Unincorporated communities in West Virginia
Coal towns in West Virginia